Guillaume Court (died 1361) was a French Cistercian theologian and Cardinal.

He was briefly bishop of Nîmes, and then bishop of Albi, in 1337, but only for a year, as Pope Benedict XII shortly elevated him to the cardinalate. He was the nephew of Benedict, who as Jacques Fournier had been a bishop of Mirepoix active in hunting heresy in south-west France; and in any case was a countryman and supporter in these activities.

Subsequently he investigated several cases of Franciscan spirituals under suspicion. The major work Liber secretorum eventuum of Joannes de Rupescissa was written to his order. In decisions of an Avignon theological tribune he headed in 1354, Joannes de Rupescissa was cleared; John of Castillon and Francis of Arquata were condemned and burned.

References

1361 deaths
French Cistercians
14th-century French cardinals
Cardinal-bishops of Frascati
Bishops of Albi
Bishops of Nîmes
Cardinal-nephews
Avignon Papacy
Year of birth unknown